The Baojun RS-7 is a midsize crossover produced by Baojun, a marque of SAIC-GM-Wuling. It was unveiled at 2020 Chongqing Auto Show.

Overview
Among Baojun models the RS-7 is considered a flagship, seeing as it is the largest and most expensive vehicle the brand sold. Like all Baojun models, its sale is limited to the Chinese market. 

The 6-seater models features a 2+2+2 layout while the 7-seater variants offer a 2+2+3 layout featuring two executive seats in the second row. The Baojun RS-7 has a high ground clearance of 198 mm (7.8 in) when measured empty and 172 mm (6.8 in) when fully seated and an approach angle of 18 degrees with a departure angle of 21 degrees proving it's all-terrain capability. Power of the Baojun RS-7 comes from a 1.5-liter turbocharged inline-four petrol engine producing , connected to an automatic transmission and front-wheel drive.

References 

RS-7
SAIC-GM-Wuling
Crossover sport utility vehicles
Cars introduced in 2020
Vehicles with CVT transmission